Hyloxalus fallax is a species of frogs in the family Dendrobatidae. It is endemic to  Ecuador and only known from the region of its type locality in the Cotopaxi Province, on the western slopes of the Andes. Common name Cotopaxi rocket frog has been coined for this species.

Description
Males measure  and females  in snout–vent length (based on only four and two specimens, respectively). It differs from related Ecuadorian species by not having webbing between its toes and by lack of oblique lateral stripe (sometimes a short stripe is present) and a pale dorsolateral stripe. Male call is a single, sharp "peep".

Habitat and conservation
This species is known from very humid premontane and low humid montane forest. One male was collected from a bromeliad. Its altitudinal range is  asl. It is threatened by habitat loss and degradation caused by agricultural expansion and logging.

References

fallax
Amphibians of the Andes
Amphibians of Ecuador
Endemic fauna of Ecuador
Taxa named by Juan A. Rivero
Amphibians described in 1991
Taxonomy articles created by Polbot